Serruria altiscapa, the stately spiderhead, is a flower-bearing shrub that belongs to the genus Serruria and forms part of the fynbos. The plant is native to the Western Cape and occurs at Blokkop in Villiersdorp as far as the Hottentots-Holland Mountains.

It occurs with Serruria elongata.

References

altiscapa